The second USS Delaware was a ship which served in the United States Navy during Quasi-War with France.

The USS Delaware was designed by naval architect William Doughty and built in the Philadelphia Naval Yard in 1794 as the merchant ship Hamburgh Packet. The Navy purchased her on May 5, 1798. Captain Stephen Decatur, Sr., was appointed to command and outfit her for sea.

During the Quasi-War with France, Delaware cruised to protect American merchant shipping from French privateers. She guarded convoys during their approach to Philadelphia and New York, patrolled the West Indies, and escorted convoys into Havana. 

Her first prize, the privateer La Croyable, was taken off Great Egg Harbor July 7, 1798. Lloyd's List (LL) reported on 17 August that the American sloop-of-war Delaware had captured a French  privateer of the American coast. The privateer had captured the merchantman Liberty, Vredenburg, master, which had been sailing from Philadelphia to Liverpool. Liberty had since been recaptured.

From 14 July to 23 September, she cruised in the West Indies, often in company with the frigate , and together the ships took two privateers prize. During her second cruise in the West Indies, between December 15, 1798 and May 20, 1799, she took another prize, and won the thanks of the merchants of Havana for the protection she had given merchantmen sailing to that port.

Delaware's return to the West Indies from July 1799 to July 1800 found her joining the Revenue Cutter  in taking a privateer sloop. She took a brig on October 29, after a 7-hour chase, rescuing 30 Americans held prisoner in the privateer. She made a final cruise off Cuba in the late fall and winter of 1800-1801, then returned to Baltimore, where she was sold early in June 1801.

See also
 Glossary of nautical terms (A-L)
 Glossary of nautical terms (M-Z)
 List of sailing frigates of the United States Navy
 USS Delaware vs La Croyable

References

Schooners of the United States Navy
Quasi-War ships of the United States